The  (English; Canadian Institute of Quebec) was founded by Marc-Aurèle Plamondon on January 17, 1848, 4 years after the founding of the Institut canadien de Montréal. Originally a library open to its members, it became public in 1897. The institute manages the public library network of Quebec City.

See also

Institut canadien de Montréal
History of Quebec 
Timeline of Quebec history 
History of Canada

External links
 Institut canadien de Québec website

History of Quebec City
Literary societies
1848 establishments in Canada
Public libraries in Quebec
French-language literature in Canada
Libraries established in 1848